Kerry Michael Collins (born December 30, 1972) is an American former professional football player who was a quarterback in the National Football League (NFL) for 17 seasons. Collins was a member of six NFL teams, most notably the Carolina Panthers, New York Giants, and Tennessee Titans. He played college football at Penn State, where he won the Maxwell Award, Davey O'Brien Award, and Sammy Baugh Trophy as a senior.

Selected by the Panthers fifth overall in the 1995 NFL Draft, Collins was the franchise's first draft selection. In his second season, he helped the Panthers become the youngest NFL expansion team to clinch their division and (along with the Jacksonville Jaguars) appear in a conference championship, also earning him Pro Bowl honors. Collins served as the Giants' starting quarterback from 1999 to 2003, leading them to a Super Bowl appearance in Super Bowl XXXV. Following a period of limited success, Collins earned a second Pro Bowl selection for helping the Titans obtain a league-best 13–3 record in 2008. He saw less playing time amid his final three years in the NFL, retiring after the 2011 season. Collins was inducted to the College Football Hall of Fame in 2018.

Early years
Collins was born in Lebanon, Pennsylvania. He attended Lebanon High School, until 1987, when he transferred to Wilson High School in West Lawn, Pennsylvania, and played football, basketball, and baseball for the Wilson Bulldogs.

College career
Collins attended Pennsylvania State University, where he played for coach Joe Paterno's Penn State Nittany Lions football team from 1991 to 1994. As a senior quarterback in 1994, he was recognized as a consensus first-team All-American, having received first-team honors from the Associated Press, United Press International, The Football News, the Football Writers Association of America, the Walter Camp Foundation and The Sporting News. Collins also captured two of college football's major postseason prizes – the Maxwell Award, presented to the nation's outstanding player, and the Davey O'Brien Award, which goes to the nation's top quarterback.  Collins finished fourth in the Heisman Trophy balloting that year.  In addition, he was chosen UPI Back-of-the-Year and garnered Player-of-the-Year honors from ABC-TV/Chevrolet and the Big Ten Conference. Collins made a serious run at the NCAA season passing efficiency record, falling just four points short (172.8), the fourth-highest figure in NCAA annals. He broke Penn State season records for total offense (2,660), completions (176), passing yardage (2,679), completion percentage (66.7), yards per attempt (10.15) and passing efficiency (172.86). He had 14 consecutive completions at Minnesota, another Penn State record. Collins was the linchpin of an explosive offense (including Ki-Jana Carter, O.J. McDuffie, Kyle Brady, and Bobby Engram) that shattered 14 school records and led the nation in scoring (47.8 ppg.) and total offense (520.2 ypg.). With 5,304 career passing yards, Collins ranks third in Penn State annals and is one of only three quarterbacks to top 5,000 yards through the air. With Collins at quarterback, the 1994 Nittany Lions completed an undefeated season, the fifth under coach Joe Paterno, capped by a Rose Bowl win over Pac-10 Champion Oregon. His team was voted #1 by the New York Times, although they were voted #2 behind undefeated Nebraska in the traditional polls (AP Poll and Coaches' Poll) used to determine Division I-A champions prior to the BCS era. In 2018, he was inducted into the College Football Hall of Fame.

Statistics

Professional career

Collins presently ranks 16th all-time in NFL career passing yardage and 11th all-time in NFL career passing completions. His TD:INT ratio and completion percentage were less impressive, however, resulting in passer ratings of 73.8 and 75.3 for the regular season and postseason. He was also less successful in wins and losses, finishing with a .450 regular season winning percentage and a .429 playoff winning percentage. Despite this, he defeated every NFL team except the Miami Dolphins.

Carolina Panthers
Collins was selected as the Carolina Panthers' first round pick (fifth overall) in the 1995 NFL Draft. He was the first player ever chosen by the Panthers in the annual college draft, though other players—some free agents, as well as players from the expansion draft—had previously signed with the team. In his three seasons with the Panthers, he threw for 7,295 yards, 39 touchdowns, and 49 interceptions. His completion percentage was 52.6% and his quarterback rating was 65.6. In his second season, he led the Panthers to the NFC Championship Game.

Collins threw 21 interceptions during the 1997 season and the Panthers finished 7–9, just one season after advancing to the NFC Championship.

Carolina started the 1998 season with Collins as its starting quarterback. After an 0–4 start, Collins walked into head coach Dom Capers' office and, as Collins later put it, "told Coach Capers my heart's not in it, I'm not happy, and I don't feel like I can play right now." He asked to be traded, but was instead placed on waivers by Carolina during the 1998 season and subsequently signed with the New Orleans Saints to finish the season.

Collins would later say that he did not intend to quit the Panthers, only to sit out for a few weeks. However, Capers interpreted his request as quitting on the team and he was released. He later admitted that much of his erratic behavior was due to his struggles with alcoholism. After being arrested for drunk driving later that year, he was ordered by the NFL to seek treatment for alcohol abuse.

Franchise records
Collins held or shared four Panthers franchise records :
 Passing touchdowns, rookie game (3; with Cam Newton x2)
 Interceptions, season (21 in 1997), rookie season (19; with Chris Weinke), rookie game (4 on 1995-11-12 @STL and 1995-11-26 @NOR; with Chris Weinke and Cam Newton)

New Orleans Saints
After being traded to the Saints, Collins started the seven games of the season, but had only two wins. In his lone season with the Saints, Collins threw for 1,202 yards, four touchdowns, and 10 interceptions.

New York Giants
Collins started the 1999 season as the Giants' second-string quarterback behind Kent Graham, but claimed the starting job in Week 11 as Graham struggled with a 5–4 record. In the 2000 season, Collins led the Giants to Super Bowl XXXV, where they lost to the Baltimore Ravens. His performance in his lone Super Bowl appearance is among the worst in NFL history. During the 2001 season, Collins set a single-season NFL record with 23 fumbles, a record tied in 2002 by then-Minnesota Vikings quarterback Daunte Culpepper. In 2002, Collins set the Giants' single season franchise passing record with 4,073 yards; this record was broken by Eli Manning in 2011. After five seasons, 68 starts and 16,875 yards, Collins was released by the Giants in 2004.  The team had already signed former league MVP Kurt Warner and traded for 2004's #1 draft pick, Eli Manning.

Franchise records
, Kerry Collins held at least seven Giants franchise records, including:
 Most Passing Yards (playoff game): 381 (2001-01-14 MIN)
 Most Passing TDs (playoff game): 5 (2001-01-14 MIN)
 Most Intercepted (playoff season): 6 (2000)
 Best Passer Rating (game): 158.3 (2002-12-22 @IND)
 Most Pass Yds/Game (playoff career): 240.0
 Most Pass Yds/Game (playoff season): 342.0 (2002)
 Most 300+ yard passing games (playoffs): two (tied with Eli Manning)

Oakland Raiders
After his release from the Giants, Collins signed a three-year, $16.82 million contract with the Oakland Raiders. Collins began the 2004 season as the team's backup to Rich Gannon, but took over the starting role when Gannon suffered a neck injury in the third week of the regular season. Collins was the team's starting quarterback for the 2005 season, subsequent to Gannon's retirement.

The 2005 season started off well for Collins, but he was benched after a 34–10 Week 12 loss to the San Diego Chargers.  He was replaced by Marques Tuiasosopo. After Tuiasosopo's 26–10 loss at the Jets in Week 13, Collins regained his starting job in Week 14 against the Cleveland Browns (a 9–7 loss at home). After two seasons and a 7–21 record with the Raiders, Collins was cut on March 10, 2006 in what was at least partially a move designed to free space with the salary cap.

Tennessee Titans
On August 28, 2006, Collins agreed to a one-year contract with the Tennessee Titans. After three games, all losses for the Titans, Collins had completed fewer than half his passes, and had thrown one touchdown and six interceptions. Vince Young, who played extensively as a substitute in the second game, started the fourth through sixth games while Collins saw no playing time in any of them. On March 5, 2007, he re-signed with the Titans.

After Young was injured against Jacksonville on September 7, 2008, Collins finished the game and was named the Titans' starting quarterback for the rest of 2008, later that week. On September 21, 2008, Collins became the 15th player in NFL history to pass for more than 35,000 yards. Coming into the game against the Houston Texans, Collins needed only 90 yards to eclipse the mark. On his ninth completion of 13 attempts, Collins completed a 17-yard pass to Justin McCareins to give him 107 yards on the day and 35,017 yards for his career.

The Titans finished the 2008 regular season with a record of 13–3, top seed in the playoffs, and a first round bye. In the divisional round, they lost to the Baltimore Ravens 13–10. A last minute field goal by Matt Stover won the game for the Ravens.  Collins indicated after the season that he would like to play in 2009, but only as a starter. Collins replaced Jets quarterback Brett Favre in the 2009 Pro Bowl, after first alternate Philip Rivers pulled out. He re-signed with the Titans on February 27, 2009. His new contract was worth $15 million, with $8.5 million guaranteed over two years.

Collins returned as the team's starting quarterback for the beginning of the 2009 season. In week six, the Titans were defeated by the New England Patriots, 59–0. After that loss and an 0–6 record on the season, coach Jeff Fisher replaced Collins as starting quarterback with Vince Young, three days before the November 1, 2009 game against the Jacksonville Jaguars. Fisher stated that he was against this decision, saying that the problems with the team were unrelated to quarterback play, but he made the substitution after being urged by Titans owner Bud Adams to do so. The Titans won five straight games with Young as quarterback, and later finished the season 8–8.

Collins officially announced his retirement from the NFL on July 7, 2011.

Indianapolis Colts
On August 24, 2011, Collins decided to forgo his retirement plans and agreed with the Indianapolis Colts on a contract deal. The contract was worth one-year and $4 million.  Collins was signed as insurance for Peyton Manning, who was recovering from offseason neck surgery. The Colts named Collins the starter for week one, ending Manning's streak of 227 consecutive starts (208 regular season plus 19 playoff games) and making Collins the first quarterback other than Manning to start a regular-season game for the Colts since Jim Harbaugh in week 17 of the 1997 NFL season.  On October 25, 2011, the Colts placed Collins on injured reserve due to a concussion, ending his season.

On March 8, the Colts officially released Collins from their active roster.

After his release, Collins did not re-sign with any team and would retire from professional football.  His 40,922 career passing yards ranks 19th all-time at present, and his 3,487 completions ranks 16th all-time at present.

NFL career statistics

Regular season

Playoffs

Major League Baseball Draft

Collins was drafted by the Detroit Tigers in the 26th round of the 1990 MLB draft, but opted to attend Penn State. Detroit selected him in the 60th round of the 1991 amateur draft, but he did not sign with the club. He was again selected in the 48th round of the 1994 amateur draft by the Toronto Blue Jays but again did not sign.

Personal life
Collins is married to Brooke Isenhour, whom he met at a George Strait concert in 2000. They have one child, a daughter.

Battles with alcoholism

Before the 1997 season got underway, Collins's private battle with alcoholism started to make public headlines.  In a highly publicized incident, on the last night of Carolina Panthers training camp in 1997, Collins used a racial slur in reference to black teammate Muhsin Muhammad while in a drunken state at a bar in Spartanburg, South Carolina. Supposedly, Collins also inadvertently slurred offensive lineman Norberto Garrido, who is of Hispanic descent. It was widely rumored that Garrido punched Collins in the eye as a result, although this was later proven false.

On November 2, 1998, Collins was arrested for drunk driving in Charlotte, North Carolina. He finished the 1998 season in New Orleans and signed with the New York Giants as a free agent on February 19, 1999.  Not long before signing with New York, Collins decided to seek treatment for his alcoholism. He entered a rehabilitation clinic in Topeka, Kansas.

While a member of the New York Giants, Collins remained in therapy for four years. As a member of the Tennessee Titans, he readdressed the 1997 racial slur incident, explaining that "The guys were talking to each other that way, and I was trying to be funny and thought I could do it, too. I was so upset by it. It was bad judgment. I could have been labeled a racist for the rest of my career. I had to live with the way I used that word with a teammate. Extremely poor judgment. I was naïve to think I could use that word in any context."

See also
 List of NCAA major college football yearly passing leaders

References

Sources
Reed, Steve (January 27, 2001). Once a lost soul, Collins turns career, life around The Gaston Gazette
Gay, Nancy (October 3, 2004). Collins appreciates second chances San Francisco Chronicle

External links

 Tennessee Titans bio
 

1972 births
Living people
All-American college football players
American football quarterbacks
Carolina Panthers players
Indianapolis Colts players
Maxwell Award winners
New Orleans Saints players
New York Giants players
Oakland Raiders players
Penn State Nittany Lions football players
People from Lebanon, Pennsylvania
Players of American football from Pennsylvania
Tennessee Titans players